The Klaudt Indian Family was a professional southern gospel group.  They were noted as being one of the most diverse groups to ever travel the gospel music circuits.

History

Ethnicity
Reverend Reinhold Klaudt was a German cattleman who, in 1929, married Lillian White Corn Little Soldier of the Arikara-Mandan tribe of Indians. She was a direct descendant of one of General Custer's scouts at the Battle of Little Big Horn and also a descendant of Chief Sitting Bull.

Performance history 
Their story began on the Fort Berthold Indian Reservation in North Dakota. Together, they raised a family dedicated to spreading the gospel through song.

Originally from "the badlands of North Dakota," the Klaudt Indian Family traveled  the countryside spreading the gospel. The Klaudts were members of the Church of God, and the Klaudts desired for their children to be educated in that faith at the Bible Training School in Cleveland, Tennessee. All of the children received their formal education there, where they expanded their musical abilities. The family consisted of Vernon, Melvin, Raymond, and Ken and their sister Ramona.

The Klaudt Indian Family began performing with Mom and Dad Klaudt, Vernon, Ramona, and Melvin. The other siblings joined the group as the years passed. Dad Klaudt left the performing group after several years to concentrate on being the business manager for the group.

The Klaudts settled in the Atlanta area and soon began traveling across the country holding revival services and singing in gospel concerts. The Klaudt Indian Family featured various instruments in their program including the upright bass, trumpet, tenor saxophone, baritone saxophone, trombone, and piano. Their music had a jazz flavor that helped open doors to the group previously unknown to the typical gospel quartet. They were also one of the first gospel singing aggregations to use a custom designed motor coach in their travels and also used semi-trucks to haul tent equipment that would expand to a seating capacity of 3,000.

Television was a vital part in the growing popularity of the Klaudt Indian Family. They were fixtures on the syndicated program, Bob Poole's Gospel Favorites.

The Klaudt Indian Family traveled as a group for more than five decades before retiring in the early  1980s. The Klaudts came out of retirement to perform for the last time on the stage of the Grand Ole Gospel Reunion in 1996 which featured Mom Klaudt at age 90.

Musical style
The gospel music audiences in the early years  must have been taken aback at the performances of the Klaudt Indian Family. While all the other groups in gospel music were using only a piano for their accompaniment, the Klaudts would showcase their music with strings and horns. Not only did their instrumentation set them apart from the norm, but they often performed in elaborate Native American costumes. This unique presentation allowed them to appear in many venues across the country. They quickly became a fixture on the Wally Fowler All Night Singing programs.,

It has been said that the Klaudt Indian Family was the first nationally known gospel music group, due  to their engagements throughout the country. In addition to gospel concerts and church venues, they played engagements in Las Vegas, state fairs, professional sports games, and theme parks. In their heyday, they would typically play more than 400 dates a year.

In addition to their singing, the Klaudt Indian Family also had their own recording label. They recorded several other gospel groups on their Family Tone label, and published sheet music and song folios to distribute to the gospel music community.

The Klaudt Indian Family demonstrated their versatility in their musical arrangements as they would perform in various aggregations including a male quartet, mixed trio, male trio, duets, solos, and instrumentals in their programs and on their recordings. Solos by Mom Klaudt backed by her boys highlighted each Klaudt Indian Family performance.

Final years and legacy

Mom Klaudt died in March 2001 and Dad died about four months later. Mrs. Klaudt was inducted into the Southern Gospel Music Hall of Fame in 2004. Most of her family was there to share in this honor.

According to the website SoGospelNews.com, Vernon Klaudt, the oldest remaining member of the Klaudt Indian Family died September 9, 2006 At 4:45 PM.  Vernon succumbed to the disease of cancer that wracked his body for over eight years.  During his last months he found time to travel in and around Atlanta, Georgia. His last ministerial effort was to raise the necessary monies to pay the 2006-2007 winter heat bill for the Fort Berthold Reservation's Indian Mission. This mission was very close to the heart of Vernon, for many of his immediate and extended Indian family received their salvation experience in this little mission.

The siblings, Ramona Carpenter, Melvin Klaudt, Raymond Klaudt and Kenneth Klaudt are still living and involved in various business ventures. They continue to keep the ministry of the Klaudt Indian Family alive. They have established the Klaudt Indian Memorial Foundation and have assisted students through their scholarship program to Lee University in Cleveland, Tennessee and the New Orleans Baptist Theological Seminary in New Orleans, Louisiana, the University of Georgia, Athens, Georgia, singing schools in Texas, Tennessee and Georgia. The purpose of the  scholarships is to honor the heritage and legacy of Mom and Dad Klaudt and to promote the teaching of gospel music to a new generation.

In the fall of 1990, Kim Klaudt, grandson of Lillian Little Soldier, and his wife founded the World Ministries, a nonprofit, nondenominational ministry as an extension of the original Klaudt family evangelist outreach.

On November 24, 2007 the Klaudt Indian Family was inducted into the Atlanta Country Music Hall of Fame and "Lillian Little Soldier Klaudt" was inducted into the Southern Gospel Museum and Hall of Fame.

On August 24, 2008 the Klaudt Indian Family received the "Lifetime Achievement Award" presented by the Atlanta Society of Entertainers.

On October 10, 2010 (10/10/10) the Klaudt Indian Family, through their 501 (c) 3 Public Charity, the "Klaudt Indian Memorial Foundation" began their TV Ministry "Just Keep Singing". Just Keep Singing, is presently viewed through several TV outlets in Georgia and has been viewed in 169 countries around the world. The TV program is produced in the studios of TV 57 WATC Atlanta Georgia. Melvin Klaudt, host and producer of the program uses, not only the Klaudts videos, but also features some of the legendary groups of the past along with many of the present day Southern Gospel Groups. The television program is now viewed world wide throughout their collaboration with aic-TV. aic-TV is an American Indian ministry out of Oklahoma City, Oklahoma.

As a result of the popularity of "Just Keep Singing", October 10 is being designated as National "Just Keep Singing Day".

In 2020, Melvin Klaudt was inducted into the Southern Gospel Music Hall of Fame.

References

External links
 YouTube video - Klaudt Indian Family - At the End of the Trail
 Press photo - 1990 Southern Gospel Singers Vernon & Betty Klaudt Indian Family

Family musical groups
Musical groups from Georgia (U.S. state)
Musical groups from North Dakota
Native American musical groups
Southern gospel performers